ClipBook Viewer is a discontinued utility included in the Windows NT family of operating system that allows users to view the contents of the local clipboard, clear the clipboard or save copied and cut items. A feature restricted version, called Clipboard Viewer, is available in Windows 9x and earlier.

ClipBook Viewer was first introduced in Windows for Workgroups 3.1. It allows users to store clipboard contents in ClipBook pages, share the contents of the clipboard with other users or save the clipboard contents to a file (with .clp extension) to reuse them later. (Clipboard files cannot be shared.) The View menu allows viewing clipboard contents in various formats such as plain text, Unicode, HTML, RTF and OLE private data. In Windows XP, it is not listed in the Start menu and can only be access through its executable file, ClipBrd.exe.

Windows NT relies on NetDDE and a Windows service called "Clipbook" (with small "b") to share ClipBook pages. Each shared page support an access control list that defines whether they can be seen, linked to, or modified.

ClipBook Viewer has been removed from Windows Vista and later; although in Windows 10, you are able to view your clipboard history by pressing win + v.

See also 
 Clipboard manager
 List of Windows components

References 

Clipboard (computing)
Discontinued Windows components